The C.A. Quintet, from Minnesota, USA, was a psychedelic rock band active in the late 1960s. They failed to gain national attention during their heyday (all their records were locally produced in Minneapolis and none had national distribution). Their only LP released during the band's existence, Trip Thru Hell, sold fewer than 1000 copies and was virtually unheard of outside of their home town. Despite its minuscule initial distribution, the record slowly gained worldwide popularity over the next twenty years among fans, collectors and musicians. Due to increasing demand, it was re-released in the early 1980s on poor quality unauthorized copies which were illegally sold by several bootleg companies. Then the original album was released on an authorized CD in 1994 on the Sundazed record label which included their singles and some unreleased material. A live album was released in 1986 of their last performance as a group, re-released in 2006 with additional material .…   An original 1969 Candy Floss release of this album sold in 2014 for $5655. They now have an Artist Channel on YouTube https://www.youtube.com/c/CAQuintet

Discography

Albums
 Trip Thru Hell (LP - 1969)
 Live 1971 (LP - 1984)
 Last trip at Lake Pepin (LP - 2006)

Trip Thru Hell 
Trip Thru Hell was a 1968 album by the C.A. Quintet. Locally produced in Minneapolis, less than 500 copies were sold in its original pressing on the Candy Floss label.  Two unauthorized versions have been reissued, an LP on the British Psycho (UNAUTHORIZED COPIES) label in 1983 with a stereo channel missing, and a (illegal) 1993 CD by the French Eva label. Both these releases are missing one track.  The album was finally legally reissued by Sundazed Records in both CD (1995) and 2xLP (1996) formats, with additional tracks and extensive liner notes.

Track Listing
 Trip Thru Hell, Pt. 1 (Erwin) - 9:09
 Colorado Mourning (Erwin)- 2:31
 Cold Spider - (Erwin) O4:41
 Underground Music (Erwin) - 4:43
 Sleepy Hollow Lane (Erwin) - 2:04
 Smooth As Silk (Erwin) - 2:12
 Trip Thru Hell, (Erwin) Pt. 2 - 3:40
 Dr. Of Philosophy (Erwin) - 2:09
 Blow To My Soul (Sandler) - 1:59
 Ain't No Doubt About it (Erwin) - 2:31
 Mickey's Monkey (Dozier, Holland, Holland) - 2:26
 I Put A Spell On You (Hawkins) - 2:47
 I Shot The King (Erwin)- 2:22
 Fortune Teller's Lie (Erwin) - 2:09
 Sadie Lavone - (Erwin) 2:49
 Bury Me In A Marijuana Field (Erwin) - 2:11
 Colorado Mourning (Alternate Version) (Erwin) - 2:13
 Underground Music (Alternate Version) (Erwin)- 2:08
 Smooth As Silk (Alternate Version) (Erwin) - 3:20

All titles by Ken Erwin except where indicated.

Singles
 Mickey's Monkey/I Want You To Love Me Girl (1967)
 Smooth As Silk/Dr. Of Philosophy (1968)

External links
 
  a blog about A Trip Thru Hell
  MidwestTribute website, since 2000.
https://www.youtube.com/channel/UCvqZPwSi0RfeZQWX1V1IMdA

Musical groups from Minnesota
American psychedelic rock music groups
Musical groups established in 1966
1966 establishments in Minnesota
Musical groups disestablished in 1971
1971 disestablishments in Minnesota